These are the results of the rhythmic individual all-around competition, the only Rhythmic Gymnastic event at the 1992 Summer Olympics. The four pieces of apparatus used were ball, clubs, hoop, and rope (ribbon was omitted). 42 gymnasts competed in the preliminary round.

The format for the competition was unusual. Instead of choosing the gymnasts with the highest scores from the qualifying round to advance to the final (as had been the case in 1984 and 1988), it was decided that the six best would qualify for the final, along with the top 12 for each apparatus, meaning that nine of the 17 finalists performed in the final with only one to three pieces of apparatus and had no chance to win.

Each gymnast carried forward half her preliminary round score (prelim score) to the final, where it was added to her score in the final (final score).

Preliminary round

Notes: 
 The highest placed non-qualifier for the final, Ancuta Goia, did not advance to the final as she did not place in the top 12 with any of the apparatus (her best was 13th with the ball). 
 Christiane Klumpp advanced to the final as she placed in the top 12 with all apparatus except ball. Li Gyong-hui advanced to the final as she placed 12th with the ball.

Final

References

External links
 http://www.gymnasticsresults.com/o1992rh.html

Women's floor
1992
1992 in women's gymnastics
Women's events at the 1992 Summer Olympics